Martina Lubyová (born 12 May 1967 in Bratislava) is a Slovak economist and politician. She served as Slovakia's minister of Education, Science, Research and Sport between 2017 and 2020. Since 2019 she is a member of the Slovak National Party.

Early life
Lubyová is a daughter of Štefan Luby, a prominent physicist and the former President of the Slovak Academy of Sciences (1995-2009). Following on the example of her father, she studied Biophysics at the Faculty of Mathematics, Physics and Informatics of the Comenius University, graduating in 1991. In 1999, she graduated in Law and Statistics, also at the Comenius University. Finally, in 2002 she obtained her PhD in Economics from CERGE-EI.

In 1995 Lubyová joined the Slovak Academy of Sciences as a researcher. In 2000, she moved to Moscow to work for the International Labour Organization. In 2010, she rejoined the Slovak Academy of Sciences and taught Statistics at the University of Economics in Bratislava.

Political career
She became the Minister of Education on 11 September 2017 as a nominee of the Slovak National Party, replacing Peter Plavčan who was forced to resign after corruption allegation related to distribution of European science funding. Lubyová herself faced criticism for distributing the funding facing an unsuccessful no-confidence vote in the parliament in 2019. Research funding allocated during her term was largely reversed by the new government after 2020.

As a Minister, Lubiová initiated a reform of university accreditation process in Slovakia, by establishing an independent Slovak Accreditation Agency for Higher Education.

In 2019, she joined the Slovak National Party. Lubyová defended the party's Chairman Andrej Danko, accused of plagiarism in his Master thesis, claiming that it is not right to harass people after 20 years since their graduation "because of some missing quotations".

Lubyová retired from politics after the Slovak National Party failed to pass the representation threshold in the 2020 Slovak parliamentary election and returned to the Slovak Academy of Sciences.

References

Living people
1967 births
Education ministers of Slovakia
Slovak National Party politicians
Politicians from Bratislava
Comenius University alumni
Slovak economists
Women government ministers of Slovakia